Elections to Castlereagh Borough Council were held on 17 May 1989 on the same day as the other Northern Irish local government elections. The election used three district electoral areas to elect a total of 21 councillors.

Election results

Note: "Votes" are the first preference votes.

Districts summary

|- class="unsortable" align="centre"
!rowspan=2 align="left"|Ward
! % 
!Cllrs
! % 
!Cllrs
! %
!Cllrs
! %
!Cllrs
! % 
!Cllrs
!rowspan=2|TotalCllrs
|- class="unsortable" align="center"
!colspan=2 bgcolor="" | DUP
!colspan=2 bgcolor="" | UUP
!colspan=2 bgcolor="" | Alliance
!colspan=2 bgcolor="" | UPUP
!colspan=2 bgcolor="white"| Others
|-
|align="left"|Castlereagh Central
|bgcolor="#D46A4C"|60.1
|bgcolor="#D46A4C"|4
|20.0
|2
|19.9
|1
|0.0
|0
|0.0
|0
|7
|-
|align="left"|Castlereagh East
|bgcolor="#D46A4C"|43.7
|bgcolor="#D46A4C"|3
|14.7
|1
|18.1
|1
|9.2
|1
|14.3
|1
|7
|-
|align="left"|Castlereagh South
|32.8
|2
|bgcolor="40BFF5"|42.0
|bgcolor="40BFF5"|3
|25.2
|2
|0.0
|0
|0.0
|0
|7
|- class="unsortable" class="sortbottom" style="background:#C9C9C9"
|align="left"| Total
|45.0
|9
|27.0
|6
|21.5
|4
|2.5
|1
|4.0
|1
|21
|-
|}

Districts results

Castlereagh Central

1985: 4 x DUP, 2 x UUP, 1 x Alliance
1989: 4 x DUP, 2 x UUP, 1 x Alliance
1985-1989 Change: No change

Castlereagh East

1985: 3 x DUP, 3 x UUP, 1 x Alliance
1989: 3 x DUP, 1 x Alliance, 1 x UUP, 1 x UPUP, 1 x Independent Unionist
1985-1989 Change: UPUP and Independent Unionist gain from UUP (two seats)

Castlereagh South

1985: 3 x DUP, 3 x UUP, 1 x Alliance
1989: 3 x UUP, 2 x DUP, 2 x Alliance
1985-1989 Change: Alliance gain from DUP

References

Castlereagh Borough Council elections
Castlereagh